Torrance Rises is a 1999 mockumentary directed by and starring Spike Jonze.

The film is based on a dance group in Torrance, California, and traces their journey to the MTV Video Music Awards presentation. The music video for Fatboy Slim's 1999 song "Praise You", also directed by Jonze, features a street performance by this group.

Torrance Rises also appears in the Palm Pictures compilation The Work Of Director Spike Jonze.

References

External links 
 

1999 films
1999 comedy films
Films directed by Spike Jonze
American comedy short films
MTV Video Music Awards
American dance films
1999 short films
1990s mockumentary films
American mockumentary films
1990s English-language films
1990s American films